James Saltonstall (born ) is an Italian international rugby league footballer who plays on the  or as a  for Halifax (UK) in the Betfred Championship.

He represented Italy in the 2013 World Cup.

Background
Saltonstall was born in Halifax, West Yorkshire, England.

Playing career
He previously played for Warrington in the Super League on the wing.

He made his Italy début in a match against Russia, qualifying through his Italian mother.
He was sent on a month's loan to the Super League side Bradford in January 2014. He played in the pre-season games against Hull FC, Dewsbury and Castleford. He scored a try against Dewsbury. In 2015, he signed for Halifax.  On 7 August 2022, Saltonstall scored four tries for Halifax in a 34-18 victory over Batley.

References

External links
Halifax profile

1993 births
Living people
Bradford Bulls players
English people of Italian descent
English rugby league players
Halifax R.L.F.C. players
Italy national rugby league team players
Rugby league players from Halifax, West Yorkshire
Rugby league wingers
Warrington Wolves players
York City Knights players